Guanine nucleotide-binding protein G(I)/G(S)/G(O) subunit gamma-4 is a protein that in humans is encoded by the GNG4 gene.

Interactions 

GNG4 has been shown to sometimes interact with GNB1.{

References

Further reading